Martin R. Dean (born July 17, 1955 in Menziken/Aargau) is a Swiss writer.

Life 

Dean was born in Menziken to a Swiss mother and an Indian physician from Trinidad. In 1976, he obtained his university entrance diploma at grammar school in Aarau. In 1977, he began studying German, philosophy, and ethnology at Universität Basel. In 1986, he finished his studies with a licentiate work about Hans Henny Jahnn’s novel "Perrudja", and graduated summa cum laude.

He traveled extensively and lived abroad for many years, in places such as South America, Portugal, France, Greece and Italy. From 1990 to 1998, he taught at the Schule für Gestaltung (School for Design) in Basel. In 1999, he started teaching German and philosophy at the grammar school in Muttenz. In 1995, he married a specialist in German studies, Dr. Silvia Henke, with whom he has a daughter.

Dean lives and works as a free writer and publicist in Basel.

Awards 

 1983 Rauris Literature Prize for Die verborgenen Gärten
 1988/89 Stipend at "Istituto Svizzero" in Rome
 1994 Complete work prize of the Swiss Schiller Foundation
 1997 Guest lecturer as "Poet in residence" at the “Gesamthochschule Essen”
 2003 Single work price of the Swiss Schiller Foundation

Works 

 Die verborgenen Gärten, novel, 1982
 Die gefiederte Frau. Fünf Variationen über die Liebe, 1984
 Der Mann ohne Licht, novel, 1988
 Außer mir. Ein Journal, 1990
 Der Guayanaknoten, novel, 1994
 Die Ballade von Billie und Joe, novel, 1997
 Monsieur Fume oder Das Glück der Vergeßlichkeit, 1998
 Meine Väter, novel, 2003
 Zwischen Fichtenbaum und Palme. Kommentierte Textsammlung für den interkulturellen Deutschunterricht an Mittelschulen, 2005

External links 

 
 
 Official Webpage by Martin R. Dean

Living people
Swiss writers
1955 births